Ved Narang is a member of the Haryana Legislative Assembly from the INLD representing the Barwala (Vidhan Sabha constituency) in Haryana.

References

Living people
Year of birth missing (living people)
Members of the Haryana Legislative Assembly
Place of birth missing (living people)
Indian National Lok Dal politicians